The 2005–06 Nemzeti Bajnokság I, also known as NB I, was the 104th season of top-tier football in Hungary. The league was officially named Borsodi Liga for sponsoring reasons. The season started on 30 July 2005 and ended on 2 June 2006.

League standings

Results

Statistical leaders

Top goalscorers

References

External links
Hungary - List of final tables (RSSSF)

Nemzeti Bajnokság I seasons
1
Hungary